Acacia striatifolia is a shrub or tree belonging to the genus Acacia and the subgenus Juliflorae that is native to north eastern Australia.

Description
It has dark red-brown branchlets that are angular to flattened towards the apices with non-prominent ridges and are densely papillose. Like most species of Acacia it has phyllodes rather than true leaves. The glabrous phyllodes are papillose especially around the base and pulvinus and have three to five prominent longitudinal nerves. It blooms between August and September producing golden flowers. The cylindrical flower-spikes have a length of  packed with deep yellow coloured flowers. The chartaceous and glabrous seed pods that form after flowering have a linear shape and are straight-sided and constricted between and raised over the seeds.

Distribution
It is endemic to the Darling Downs district of Queensland where it is situated on undulating or hilly country within the state forests to the north of Chinchilla where it grows in shallow, sandy and gravelly soils as a part of Eucalyptus woodland communities or in dense stands.

See also
List of Acacia species

References

striatifolia
Flora of Queensland
Taxa named by Leslie Pedley
Plants described in 1978